Lickskillet may refer to:
Lickskillet, Logan County, Kentucky
Lickskillet, Meade County, Kentucky
former name for Clifty, Kentucky, in Todd County
former name for Glenville, Kentucky, in McLean County